The Aschiza are a section of the Brachycera. Two large families, the Syrphidae and the Phoridae, and a number of smaller taxa are in this group. They are similar to most of the familiar Muscomorpha with one notable exception; they do not possess a ptilinum, so lack the prominent ptilinal suture on the face as in other muscoid flies. They do still have a puparium with a circular emergence opening, but it is not as precisely ellipsoid in shape as is typical for other muscoids.
The term was first used by Eduard Becher .

References

External links 

Tree of Life. Cyclorrhapha